The 36th government of Turkey (15 April 1973 – 26 January 1974) was a government in the history of Turkey. It is also called the Talu government.

Background 
After Fahri Korutürk was elected the president of Turkey, the previous prime minister Ferit Melen resigned. Korutürk appointed Naim Talu, an independent who had been the Minister of Commerce in the Melen government, as the new prime minister. Naim Talu formed his government with the support of the Justice Party (AP) and the Republican Reliance Party (CGP).

The government

Aftermath
The government ended by the general elections held on 14 October 1973.

References

Cabinets of Turkey
1973 establishments in Turkey
Justice Party (Turkey) politicians
Republican Reliance Party politicians
1974 disestablishments in Turkey
Cabinets established in 1973
Cabinets disestablished in 1974
Coalition governments of Turkey
Members of the 36th government of Turkey
14th parliament of Turkey